Dennis Moore (born Dennis Meadows; January 26, 1908 – March 1, 1964) was an actor who specialized in Western  films and film serials.

Early years
Moore was born Dennis Meadows in Fort Worth, Texas, and attended schools in El Paso. He was active in aviation and had a pilot's license. Before going into films, he worked in stock theater.
 
A plane crash nearly ended his life. After more than a year spent in a hospital and two additional years of recovery, he could not pass the physical examination for a pilot's license, so he chose to change from aviation to acting.

Career
Moore began appearing in short subjects and low-budget feature films in the 1930s under the name Denny Meadows and enjoyed greater recognition and employment after he changed his professional name to Dennis Moore.

His dark looks and solemn demeanor kept him working steadily as an all-purpose utility player, in both heroic and villainous roles. Moore became a familiar face in Westerns, but never became a major star. In 1942, he co-starred for six films in PRC's Lone Rider series, beginning with The Lone Rider and the Bandit and ending with Overland Stagecoach.

He also appeared on television in the syndicated The Range Rider, with Jock Mahoney and Dick Jones, in the 1955 CBS series Brave Eagle with Keith Larsen, and in the 1956 episode "Panhandle" of the CBS series Tales of the Texas Rangers, with Willard Parker and Harry Lauter.

He was cast as Mr. Finley in "The Gold Watch" and as Jeb in "A Permanent Juliet" on the NBC Western series Buckskin, starring Tom Nolan, Sally Brophy, and Mike Road. He was cast as Walker in the 1958 episode "Three Wanted Men" of the syndicated Western series Frontier Doctor, starring Rex Allen. At this time, he also made multiple appearances on Richard Carlson's syndicated Western series Mackenzie's Raiders.

He also guest-starred on the syndicated adventure series Rescue 8, starring Jim Davis and Lang Jeffries,  the crime drama U.S. Marshal, starring John Bromfield, and the NBC Western Riverboat, starring Darren McGavin.

Moore played leads or second leads in serials, and holds the distinction of having appeared in the last serials produced by Universal Pictures in 1946 and Columbia Pictures in 1956.

Later years
Moore moved with his family from Los Angeles to Big Bear Lake, operating a gift shop there.

Death
On March 1, 1964, Moore died of rheumatic heart disease in San Bernardino, California.

Selected filmography

 The Dawn Rider (1935)
 China Clipper (1936)
 Desert Justice (1936)
 Fugitive in the Sky (1936) Unbilled
 Irish Luck (1939)
 Overland Mail (1939)
 Girl from Rio (1939)
 Boys of the City (1940) as Giles
Fugitive from a Prison Camp (1940)
 Flying Wild (1941) as George
 Bowery Blitzkrieg (1941) as Dorgan 
 Spooks Run Wild (1941) as Dr. Von Grosch 
 The Lone Rider Fights Back (1941) as Al Williams
 Billy the Kid in Santa Fe (1941) as Silent Don Benson
 The Lone Rider and the Bandit (1942) as Sheriff Smoky Moore
 The Lone Rider in Cheyenne (1942) as Sheriff Smoky Moore
 The Lone Rider in Texas Justice (1942) as Sheriff Smoky Moore
 Border Roundup (1942) as Sheriff Smoky Moore
 Outlaws of Boulder Pass (1942) as Sheriff Smoky Moore
 Overland Stagecoach (1942) as Sheriff Smoky Moore
 Arizona Trail (1943)
 West of the Rio Grande  (1944)
 The Mummy's Curse (1944) as Dr. James Halsey
 Song of the Range (1944) as Denny
 The Frozen Ghost (1945) Radio Show Announcer (uncredited)
 The Crime Doctor's Courage (1945) David Lee (uncredited) 
 The Master Key (1945)
 Colorado Serenade (1946) as Duke Dillon
 Rainbow Over the Rockies (1947)
 Frontier Agent (1948)
 Range Renegades (1948)
 Across the Rio Grande (1949) as Carson 
 Life of St. Paul series (1949) as Roman Centurion
 I Killed Geronimo (1950) as Henchman Luke 
 Hot Rod (1950)
 Federal Man (1950) as Harry
 Snow Dog (1950) as LaFontaine Factor (uncredited) 
 Gunslingers (1950) as Marshal Dean
 Yukon Manhunt (1951) as Henchman
 Blazing Bullets (1951) as Crowley - Henchman
 The Lusty Men (1952)
 The Shrike (1955) as spectator
 The White Squaw (1956) as rancher (uncredited)
 Friendly Persuasion (1956) Farmer (uncredited)
 Blazing the Overland Trail (1956) as Ed Marr, Pony Express relay station manager
 The Phantom Stagecoach (1957) as Townsman
 The Restless Gun (1958) in Episode "The Manhunters"
 Bat Masterson (1959) as Tom
 Bat Masterson (1960) as Sheriff
 Bat Masterson (1961) as Hacker

References

External links
 
 
 
 

1908 births
1964 deaths
American male film actors
American male television actors
Male Western (genre) film actors
Male actors from Fort Worth, Texas
Actors from San Bernardino, California
20th-century American male actors
Western (genre) television actors